A takeoff/go-around switch (TO/GA) is a switch on the autothrottle of modern large aircraft, with two modes: takeoff (TO) and go-around (GA). The mode is dependent on the phase of flight; usually, on approach to land, the autopilot will be set to approach mode, therefore if the TO/GA switch is pressed it will activate the go-around mode of the autothrottle; conversely, when takeoff is set on the autopilot, the switch activates takeoff mode of the autothrottle. On Boeing aircraft TO/GA modes are selected by a separate switch near the throttle levers, but on Airbus aircraft it is activated by pushing the thrust levers fully forward to the TO/GA detent.

Takeoff
Once an aircraft has lined up, the pilots first increase the engine power to 40–60% N1 (low-pressure compressor RPM) on Boeing aircraft, and 50% N1 on Airbus aircraft. Large jet engines accelerate slowly from idle to approximately 40%, and stabilising the engines prior to applying full power prevents a large thrust asymmetry from causing directional problems if one engine accelerates more quickly. This can also reduce the risk of a compressor stall. Once the engines are confirmed to be stable, the pilots then either press the TO/GA switch, causing the thrust levers to automatically advance themselves to the appropriate power setting (on Boeings), or manually advance the thrust levers to the TO/GA detent (on Airbuses). (In Airbus aircraft, if de-rated takeoff power is desired, the thrust levers are instead advanced to the FLX/MCT detent.) In all cases, the engine speeds then increase to provide the computed takeoff power. Flight management computers on modern aircraft determine the amount of power needed by the engines in order to reach takeoff speed; a number of factors have to be taken into account, including runway length, wind speed, temperature, and most importantly the weight of the aircraft. In older aircraft these calculations were performed by the pilots before takeoff. The advantage of having such a system is the ability to reduce wear and tear on the engines by using only as much power as is actually required to ensure the aircraft reaches a safe takeoff speed.

Go-around
The go-around setting is used during the approach. If a pilot finds that they are unable to land safely, or deems it necessary to go-around for any reason, activating this switch (usually positioned on the back of the throttle levers) will increase the power to go-around thrust. Importantly, the TO/GA switch modifies the autopilot mode, so it does not continue to follow the Instrument Landing System (ILS) glide slope and it overrides any auto-throttle mode which would keep the aircraft in landing configuration. On Airbus aircraft, it does not disengage the autopilot but causes it to stop following the ILS and to perform the go-around maneuver automatically. In an emergency situation, using a TO/GA switch is often the quickest way of increasing thrust to abort a landing. 

On some aircraft, the TO/GA switch commands the autopilot to fly a missed approach pattern, if the autopilot is programmed to do so.

See also 
 China Airlines Flight 140, crash caused by inadvertent activation of the TO/GA switch on landing
 One-Two-GO Airlines Flight 269, crash caused by a failure to activate the TO/GA switch on an attempt to go around
 Atlas Air Flight 3591, crash caused by inadvertent activation of the TO/GA switch on initial approach and improper pilot response
 Emirates Flight 521, crash due to TO/GA switch being inhibited due to pilot error

References

 Controlling Pilot Error: Automation By Vladimir Risukhin, 2001, p43-45
 Better Takeoffs & Landings By Michael C. Love, 1995, page 192
 

Aircraft controls